The Crowley's Ridge State Park Bridge is a historic masonry stone arch bridge in Crowley's Ridge State Park, near Walcott, Arkansas. The bridge carries the main access road to the park across a drainage ditch. It is one of several CCC-built structures still standing in the park, and is a well-built example of the rustic architecture popularized by the CCC.

The bridge was listed on the National Register of Historic Places in 1992.

See also
National Register of Historic Places listings in Greene County, Arkansas
List of bridges on the National Register of Historic Places in Arkansas

References

Crowley's Ridge
Transportation in Greene County, Arkansas
Bridges completed in 1935
National Register of Historic Places in Greene County, Arkansas
Road bridges on the National Register of Historic Places in Arkansas
1935 establishments in Arkansas
Civilian Conservation Corps in Arkansas
Rustic architecture in Arkansas
Stone arch bridges in the United States